Jefrud or Jafrud may refer to:
 Jefrud-e Bala
 Jefrud-e Pain